The 2018 Suruga Bank Championship was the eleventh edition of the Suruga Bank Championship (also referred to as the J.League Cup / Copa Sudamericana Championship Final), the club football match co-organized by the Japan Football Association, the football governing body of Japan, CONMEBOL, the football governing body of South America, and J.League, the professional football league of Japan, between the champions of the previous season's J.League Cup and Copa Sudamericana.

The match was contested between Japanese team Cerezo Osaka, the 2017 J.League Cup champions, and Argentinian team Independiente, the 2017 Copa Sudamericana champions. It was hosted by Cerezo Osaka at the Yanmar Stadium Nagai in Osaka, Japan on 8 August 2018.

Independiente defeated Cerezo Osaka 1–0 to win their first Suruga Bank Championship title.

Teams

Format
The Suruga Bank Championship was played as a single match, with the J.League Cup winners hosting the match. If tied at the end of regulation, extra time would not be played, and the penalty shoot-out would be used to determine the winner. A maximum of six substitutions may be made during the match.

Match

Details

See also
2017 J.League Cup Final
2017 Copa Sudamericana Finals

References

External links
スルガ銀行チャンピオンシップ2018, Japan Football Association 
スルガ銀行チャンピオンシップ2018, J.League 
Copa Suruga Bank, CONMEBOL.com 

2018
2018 in Japanese football
2018 in South American football
2018 in Argentine football
Cerezo Osaka matches
Club Atlético Independiente matches
August 2018 sports events in Japan